Wudil is a Local Government Area in Kano State, Nigeria. Its headquarters are in the town of Wudil on the A237 highway.

It has an area of 362 km and a population of 185,189 at the 2006 census.

The postal code of the area is 713101.

Notable People

Notable Clans
Jobawa
Torankawa

Notable dynasties

References

Local Government Areas in Kano State